Domada Chitti Abbayi or Chittabbayi (Telugu: దోమాడ చిట్టబ్బాయి) (1930–2002) was a renowned Nadaswaram Vidwan and recipient of the prestigious Sangeet Natak Akademi Award.

He was born in East Godavari district, Andhra Pradesh. He learned Nadaswaram from Daliparti Piccha Hari.

He was associated with Sangeetha Kalanidhi Nedunuri Krishnamurthy for a long time.

He was "Asthana Vidwan" of Sri Varaha Laxmi Narasimha Swamy Devasthanam, Simhachalam.

Death

Chittabbaiyi died in 2002 at the age of 72.

Awards
 Sangeet Natak Akademi Award in 1978.
 Andhra University honored him with Kala Prapoorna in 1990.

References

Recipients of the Sangeet Natak Akademi Award
1930 births
2002 deaths
Carnatic instrumentalists
20th-century Indian musicians